is a Japanese actor and model who is represented by AT Production. He played the role of Ramon (Basshaa) in the 2008 Kamen Rider TV series Kamen Rider Kiva.

Biography
In 2007, Ogoe became a guest star in episodes 5 and 6 of Kamen Rider Den-O. The following year, he portrayed Basshaa's human form, Ramon in Kamen Rider Kiva. In 2010, he got the role of Ryoma Echizen's sixth musical actor in Tenimyu. He is the first and only Ryoma Echizen of the second season of Tenimyu and part of the sixth-generation and seventh-generation Seigaku cast. In April 2015, along with fellow Tenimyu actors, Dori Sakurada, Hisanori Sato, and Airu Shiozaki, he starred in Rock Opera: Psychedelic Pain. In March 2015, Ogoe confirmed on his blog that he would be portraying Ken Kaneki of the popular manga series Tokyo Ghoul created by Sui Ishida for a stage play with his fellow Kiva and Tenimyu actors, Mitsu Murata and Yuki Kimisawa. In August 2015, he was revealed to be the new portrayer of Sakamichi Onoda for the new Yowamushi Pedal stage play Yowamushi Pedal Irregular.

During his time in Tenimyu, he earned the title "The Prince of Tenimyu" because he performed 518 performances in a row without ever missing one. He currently has the record for the most performances performed in Tenimyu.

Ogoe later announced that he will be giving up his role as Ken Kaneki in the July 2017 run of Tokyo Ghoul stage play during Jump Festa 2017.

Ogoe will be starring as Nobita Nobi in the re-run of Doraemon: Nobita and the Animal stage play that was first performed in 2009.

In July 2021, his agency announced that Ogoe injured his right clavicle while shooting NHK Premium Drama Living Again. As per his request, Ogoe will still continue performing for Umebo 12th WONDER "Odonro".

Filmography

TV series

Films

Stage plays and musicals

References

External links
 Official profile at TACHI PRO, INC. 

21st-century Japanese male actors
Japanese male models
1994 births
Living people
People from Tokyo